Angunakolapelessa Divisional Secretariat is a  Divisional Secretariat  of Hambantota District, of Southern Province, Sri Lanka.

References
 Divisional Secretariats Portal

Divisional Secretariats of Hambantota District